The 2001 Tampa Bay Devil Rays season was their fourth since the franchise was created. This season, they finished last in the AL East division, finished the season with a record of 62–100. Their managers were Larry Rothschild and Hal McRae, the latter of whom replaced Rothschild shortly after the season began.

Offseason
November 2, 2000: Bill Pulsipher was signed as a free agent with the Tampa Bay Devil Rays.
November 27, 2000: Quinton McCracken was released by the Tampa Bay Devil Rays.
November 27, 2000: Jim Morris was released by the Tampa Bay Devil Rays.
 January 8, 2001: Johnny Damon was traded as part of a 3-team trade by the Kansas City Royals with Mark Ellis to the Oakland Athletics. The Oakland Athletics sent Ben Grieve to the Tampa Bay Devil Rays. The Oakland Athletics sent Ángel Berroa and A. J. Hinch to the Kansas City Royals. The Tampa Bay Devil Rays sent Cory Lidle to the Oakland Athletics. The Tampa Bay Devil Rays sent Roberto Hernandez to the Kansas City Royals.
March 23, 2001: Bill Pulsipher was released by the Tampa Bay Devil Rays.

Regular season

Opening Day starters
Vinny Castilla
Steve Cox
John Flaherty
Ben Grieve
Albie Lopez
Felix Martinez
Fred McGriff
Bob Smith
Greg Vaughn
Gerald Williams

Season standings

Record vs. opponents

Transactions
April 4, 2001: Kenny Kely was purchased by the Seattle Mariners from the Tampa Bay Devil Rays.
June 5, 2001: Dewon Brazelton was drafted by the Tampa Bay Devil Rays in the 1st round (3rd pick) of the 2001 amateur draft. Player signed August 25, 2001.
 June 5, 2001: Jon Switzer was drafted by the Tampa Bay Devil Rays in the 2nd round of the 2001 amateur draft. Player signed August 13, 2001.

Citrus Series
The annual interleague games between the Florida Marlins and the Tampa Bay Devil Rays were played in June and July. They are known as the Citrus Series. The Marlins won the series 4-2.
June 15- @ Marlins 7- Devil Rays 4 
June 16- @ Marlins 11- Devil Rays 0 
June 17- @ Marlins 6- Devil Rays 4 
July 6- @ Devil Rays 5- Marlins 4 (11 innings) 
July 7- @ Devil Rays 4- Marlins 3 
July 8- Marlins 6- @ Devil Rays 1

Roster

Player stats

Batting

Starters by position
Note: Pos = Position; G = Games played; AB = At bats; H = Hits; Avg. = Batting average; HR = Home runs; RBI = Runs batted in

Other batters
Note: G = Games played; AB = At bats; H = Hits; Avg. = Batting average; HR = Home runs; RBI = Runs batted in

Pitching

Starting pitchers
Note: G = Games pitched; IP = Innings pitched; W = Wins; L = Losses; ERA = Earned run average; SO = Strikeouts

Other pitchers
Note: G = Games pitched; IP = Innings pitched; W = Wins; L = Losses; ERA = Earned run average; ERA = Earned run average

Relief pitchers
Note: G = Games pitched; W = Wins; L = Losses; SV = Saves; ERA = Earned run average; SO = Strikeouts

Farm system

References

2001 Tampa Bay Devil Rays at Baseball Reference
2001 Tampa Bay Devil Rays team page at www.baseball-almanac.com

Tampa Bay Devil Rays seasons
Tampa Bay Devil Rays Season, 2001
Tampa Bay Devil Rays